Vyacheslav Korovin (born 8 September 1962) is a Russian former track and field athlete who competed in the hammer throw for the Soviet Union. He ranks within the all-time top thirty for the event, as of 2016.

The sole international medal of his career came at the 1981 European Athletics Junior Championships, where he threw  to take the bronze medal behind Christoph Sahner and Sergey Dorozhon. This ranked him third in the world that year behind fellow Soviets Sergey Litvinov and Igor Astapkovich – both of whom were Olympic medallists. This proved to be a brief peak for Korovin as he did not break eighty metres again and his next highest ranking was twelfth in the 1989 season.

References

External links

Living people
1962 births
Soviet male hammer throwers
Russian male hammer throwers